Silver Route may refer to the:

 Silver Road, a historical holiday route in Germany
 Vía de la Plata, an ancient commercial and pilgrimage road in Spain